Dischidia vidalii, commonly known as an "ant plant" or "kangaroo pouch", is a plant in the genus Dischidia native to the Philippines. D. vidalii is an epiphytic climbing plant with clusters of pink or magenta flowers. Like some others in its genus like Dischidia major and in the related genus Hoya, this species has evolved a symbiotic relationship with ants. In addition to small, oval leaves the plant develops significantly larger, hollow leaves where additional roots grow and there is habitat for ants where water and debris collect that nourish the roots.

References

Dischidia
Endemic flora of the Philippines
Plants described in 1886